Samuel Dickens (ca. 1775July 22, 1840) was a Congressional Representative from North Carolina; born near Roxboro in Person County, North Carolina around 1775. He was a member of the North Carolina state house of commons from 1813 to 1815, and in 1818. He was elected as a Democratic-Republican to the Fourteenth Congress to fill the vacancy caused by the death of United States Representative Richard Stanford (December 2, 1816 – March 3, 1817). He moved to Madison County, Tennessee in 1820 and died there in 1840.

See also 
 Fourteenth United States Congress

External links 

 U.S. Congress Biographical Directory entry

1770s births
1840 deaths
People from Person County, North Carolina
Members of the North Carolina House of Representatives
Democratic-Republican Party members of the United States House of Representatives from North Carolina
People from Madison County, Tennessee
19th-century American politicians